Peters baby is a 1961 Danish comedy film directed by Annelise Reenberg and starring Ebbe Langberg.

Cast
 Ebbe Langberg as Peter Bergman
 Ghita Nørby as Tony
 Dario Campeotto as Sanger
 Dirch Passer as William Thorsen
 Inger Stender as Peters mor
 Emil Hass Christensen as Peters far
 Gabriel Axel as Fransk politimand
 Mogens Brandt as Fransk hotelejer
 Paul Hagen as Holgersen
 Judy Gringer as Kirsten
 Bjørn Puggaard-Müller as Kordegn

External links

1961 films
1960s Danish-language films
1961 comedy films
Films directed by Annelise Reenberg
Films scored by Sven Gyldmark
Danish comedy films